Nigel Joshua Reynoso (born September 27, 1989), known professionally as Nasty Nigel, is an American rapper from Corona, Queens. His debut solo extended play (EP) El Utimo Playboy: La Vida Y Los Tiempos De Nigel Rubirosa was released in 2016.

Discography

Extended plays

with World's Fair 
 Studio albums
 Bastards of the Party (2013)

with Children of the Night 
 Mixtapes
 Where the Wild Things Are (2009)
 Yes or No (2010)
 Queens... Revisited (2012)

Guest appearances

References 

1989 births
Living people
American rappers
People from Corona, Queens
21st-century American rappers